Cosmosoma metallescens is a moth of the subfamily Arctiinae. It was described by Édouard Ménétries in 1857. It is found from Mexico to the Amazon region.

References

metallescens
Moths described in 1857